

Wilhelm Schmalz (1 March 1901 – 14 March 1983) was a German general (Generalleutnant) in the Wehrmacht during World War II and a recipient of the Knight's Cross of the Iron Cross with Oak Leaves of Nazi Germany. Schmalz surrendered to the American troops in May 1945. 

Schmalz was tried and acquitted of war crimes  by a court in Rome on 12 July 1950. This included the Civitella in Val di Chiana massacre on 29 June 1944 where 146 civilians were murdered by soldiers of the Fallschirm-Panzer Division 1 Hermann Göring. .

Awards and decorations
 Iron Cross (1939) 2nd Class (14 September 1939) & 1st Class (16 October 1939)

 German Cross in Gold on 8 February 1942 as Major in Kradschützen-Bataillon 59
 Knight's Cross of the Iron Cross with Oak Leaves
 Knight's Cross on 28 November 1940 as Major and commander of I./Kavallerie-Schützen-Regiment 11
 358th Oak Leaves on 23 December 1943 as Oberst and commander of Panzerbrigade z.b.V. der Panzer-Division "Hermann Göring"

References

Citations

Bibliography

 
 

1901 births
1983 deaths
People from Saalekreis
People from the Province of Saxony
Luftwaffe World War II generals
Recipients of the Gold German Cross
Recipients of the Knight's Cross of the Iron Cross with Oak Leaves
German prisoners of war in World War II held by the United States
Lieutenant generals of the Luftwaffe
Military personnel from Saxony-Anhalt
Fallschirmjäger of World War II